International arbitration is arbitration between companies or individuals in different states, usually by including a provision for future disputes in a contract.

Arbitration agreements and arbitral awards are enforced under the  United Nations Convention on the Recognition and Enforcement of Foreign Arbitral Awards of 1958 (the "New York Convention"). The International Centre for the Settlement of Investment Disputes (ICSID) also handles arbitration, but it is limited to investor-state dispute settlement.

The New York Convention was drafted under the auspices of the United Nations and has been ratified by more than 150 countries, including most major countries involved in significant international trade and economic transactions. The New York Convention requires the states that have ratified it to recognize and enforce international arbitration agreements and foreign arbitral awards issued in other contracting states, subject to certain limited exceptions. These provisions of the New York Convention, together with the large number of contracting states, have created an international legal regime that significantly favors the enforcement of international arbitration agreements and awards. It was preceded by the 1927 Convention on the Execution of Foreign Arbitral Awards in Geneva.

Features 
International arbitration allows the parties to avoid local court procedures. International arbitration has different rules than domestic arbitration, and has its own non-country-specific standards of ethical conduct.

The process may be more limited than typical litigation and forms a hybrid between the common law and civil law legal systems. For example, the International Bar Association (IBA)'s Rules on the Taking of Evidence in International Commercial Arbitration, revised in 2010, do not  adopt common law broad disclosure procedures (discovery) or follow the civil law in eliminating entirely the ability of engaging in some disclosure-related practices. The IBA Rules blend common and civil systems so that parties may narrowly tailor disclosure to the agreement's particular subject matter.

David Rivkin, who chaired the committee that drafted the rules, has noted that the wide adoption of these rules in international arbitration has led in practice to an unexpected use by common law practitioners to limit disclosure and by civil law practitioners to expand it.

The rules can be further impacted by arbitral rules that may be agreed between the parties.

A presumption of confidentiality—whether implied or explicit—exists between the parties to an international commercial arbitration; however, there may be a disconnect between that presumption and the realities of disclosure and publicity imposed by the courts, arbitrators, and even the parties themselves.

Global enforcement 
Most countries, especially in the developed world, are signatories of the New York Convention. Consequently, judgements can be enforced across the world. The New York Convention, more formally known as the United Nations Convention on the Recognition and Enforcement of Foreign Arbitral Awards, provides for court recognition and enforcement of foreign arbitration decisions, allowing arbitration proceedings to piggyback on the authority of domestic jurisdictions across the world.

In contrast, there is no equivalent treaty for the international recognition of court decisions with a large membership although the Hague Convention of 30 June 2005 on Choice of Court Agreements entered into force in 2015 for the European Union and Mexico. Similarly, no equivalent treaty exists so far for the international recognition of settlements achieved in mediation or conciliation:so far, a meeting of the UNCITRAL Working Group II in New York has taken place in February 2015 subsequent to a US proposal for that working group to develop a convention on the enforcement of conciliated settlement agreements for international commercial disputes. Within the EU, the enforceability of mediation agreements is ruled by Directive 2008/52/EC.

Protection from lawsuits 
Under the New York Convention, if a party to arbitration files a lawsuit in breach of an arbitration agreement, the court is obligated to recognize an agreement in writing under which the parties undertake to submit to arbitration. Chapter 2 of the Federal Arbitration Act sets forth the statutory basis for an American court to direct that arbitration be held.

Enforcement
Under the New York Convention, Article III requires courts in contracting states to recognize international arbitral awards as binding and enforce them. Article V provides for seven reasons that a court can use to refuse to enforce the award.

Cases and statistics 
Public information on overall and specific arbitration cases is quite limited as there is no need to involve the courts at all unless there is a dispute, and in most cases the loser pays voluntarily. In China, a review of disputed cases in China found that from 2000 to 2011, in 17 cases the Supreme People's Court upheld the refusal to enforce the arbitration agreement due to a provision in Article V; China has an automatic appeal system to the highest court, so this includes all such refusals.

Agreement details

A number of essential elements should be included in almost all international arbitration agreements, with model language available. These include the agreement to arbitrate, a definition of the scope of disputes subject to arbitration, the means for selecting the arbitrator(s), a choice of the arbitral seat, and the adoption of institutional or ad hoc arbitration rules.  A number of other provisions can also be included in international arbitration clauses, including the language for the conduct of the arbitration, choice of applicable law, arbitrator qualifications, interim relief, costs, and procedural matters.

In order to bridge the gap when parties to an international agreement have difficulty in agreeing upon an arbitral institution, some international arbitration specialists recommend using an arbitration clause that authorizes two arbitral institutions in the same city. Those clauses generally empower the party commencing the arbitration to select the arbitral institution.

A mnemonic device, “BLINC LLC”,  reflects some of the most important clauses: broad, law, institutional, number, costs, location, language, and carve-out.

Arbitration organizations 
Several major international institutions and rule making bodies set out rules and appoint arbitrators. The most significant are:

Other Important Institutions for Arbitration in North America are JAMS International, the British Columbia International Commercial Arbitration Centre (BCICAC, Canada).

Specialist ADR bodies also exist, such as the World Intellectual Property Organisation (WIPO), which has an arbitration and mediation center and a panel of international neutrals specialising in intellectual property and technology related disputes.

A number of arbitral institutions have adopted the UNCITRAL Rules for use in international cases. See for example, Australia's adoption of the UNCITRAL Rules in its 6 July 2010 amendment to the 'International Arbitration Act 1974' (Cth).

The most salient feature of the rules of the ICC is its use of the "terms of reference." The "terms of reference" is a summary of the claims and issues in dispute and the particulars of the procedure and is prepared by the tribunal and signed by the parties near the beginning of the proceedings.

In a more recent development, the Swiss Chambers of Commerce and Industry of Basel, Berne, Geneva, Lausanne, Lugano, Neuchâtel and Zurich have adopted a new set of Swiss Rules of Commercial Mediation that are designed to integrate fully with the Swiss Rules of International Arbitration that were previously adopted by these chambers to harmonize international arbitration and mediation proceedings across Switzerland.

Research and other organizations 
The International Arbitration Institute, until recently headed by the late Emmanuel Gaillard, was created in 2001, under the auspices of the Comité français de l’arbitrage (CFA), to promote exchanges and transparency in the international commercial arbitration community. The Association for International Arbitration is a non-profit organisation founded in Paris in 2001 by Johan Billiet which provides information, training and educational activities but does not appoint arbitrators.

ASA - Swiss Arbitration Association, a non-profit association since 1974, together with ASA Below 40, has over 1’200 members, practitioners and academics engaged and/or interested in domestic and international arbitration, from Switzerland and abroad. ASA contributes to the development of arbitration law and practice through regular conferences and workshops, including the Annual Conference; the Arbitration Practice Seminar; ASA Local Group meetings; ASA below 40 events for young practitioners, and the publication of the ASA Bulletin, an arbitration quarterly, and of the ASA Special Series.

International investment and ICSID 

The International Centre for the Settlement of Investment Disputes (ICSID) is an ad hoc tribunal established pursuant to UNCITRAL Rules to arbitrate International Investment Agreements and provide foreign investors with a means for redress against states for breaches of contract. The ICSID was designed so that it cannot be reviewed by domestic courts which in theory makes it more enforceable. However, state immunity to lawsuits and judgments poses a barrier to collection.

The legal protection of foreign direct investment is guaranteed by a network of more than 2750 Bilateral Investment Treaties (BITs), Multilateral Investment Treaties, most notably the Energy Charter Treaty and a number of free trade agreements containing chapter on investment protection through investor-state dispute settlement, such as NAFTA. The overall number of cases concluded reached 244. Of them, approximately 42% were decided in favour of the state and approximately 31% in favour of the investor. Approximately 27% of the cases were settled.

Interstate arbitration 

Arbitration has been used for centuries, including in antiquity, for the resolution of disputes between states and state-like entities. After a period of relative disuse, Jay's Treaty between the United States and Great Britain revived international arbitration as a means of resolving interstate disputes. The 1899 and 1907 Hague Conferences addressed arbitration as a mechanism for resolving state-to-state disputes, leading to the adoption of the Hague Conventions for the Pacific Settlement of International Disputes.  The Conventions established the Permanent Court of Arbitration and a rudimentary institutional framework for international arbitration of interstate disputes. In recent years, international arbitration has been used to resolve a number of disputes between states or state-like entities, including Eritrea v. Yemen, the Abyei Arbitration, the OSPAR Arbitration, and the Iron Rhine Arbitration.

See also
Charles C. Adams Jr.
American Arbitration Association
Arbitration award
Broom corn brooms
Jean-Paul Beraudo
George Bermann
Gary Born
International Arbitration League
International Arbitration and Peace Association
International Bar Association
International Chamber of Commerce
Albert Jan van den Berg
London Court of International Arbitration
Jan Paulsson
Permanent Court of Arbitration
United Nations Commission on International Trade Law
Siegfried H. Elsing
Kompetenz-kompetenz
United Nations Convention on Transparency in Treaty-based Investor-State Arbitration

Lectures
 Lecture by Georges Abi-Saab entitled The International Judicial Function in the Lecture Series of the United Nations Audiovisual Library of International Law
 Lecture by Stephen M. Schwebel entitled The Merits (and Demerits) of International Adjudication and Arbitration in the Lecture Series of the United Nations Audiovisual Library of International Law

Further reading

 Schinazi, Mikaël (2021). The Three Ages of International Commercial Arbitration. Cambridge University Press.

References

External links 

Straus Institute for Dispute Resolution at Pepperdine University School of Law
International Arbitration Institute (IAI)
The Association for International Arbitration (AIA)
 S.I. Strong, International Commercial Arbitration: A Guide for U.S. Judges, Federal Judicial Center, December 2012, 152 pp.
International Commercial Arbitration Resources
 E. Gaillard, Legal Theory of International Arbitration, Martinus Nijhoff Publishers, May 2010, 202 pp.
 International Arbitration Search Engine
 Fouchard Gaillard Goldman On International Commercial Arbitration, Kluwer, 1999 (and its French edition, Traité de l’arbitrage commercial international, Litec 1996)
 CMS Guide to Arbitration (a summary of international arbitration law in 32 jurisdictions)
 International Arbitration Books
 CMS Guide to Arbitration: Resources and Materials (common arbitration rules and references)
 Arbitration procedures and practice in the UK (England and Wales): overview Thomson Reuters Practical Law
 Arbitration Procedures and Practice in the United States: Overview Thomson Reuters Practical Law

Arbitration

Diplomacy